Stephen Harold Capen (February 28, 1946 - September 12, 2005) was an American Radio announcer and disc jockey whose humor found favor with audiences in several major cities but particularly in the San Francisco Bay Area.  In the mid-1960s, he began his radio career in Caribou, Maine.

Biography

Early life and education
Capen, the second of four children, was born in Cambridge, Massachusetts to Hobart Ashley Capen and Mary Capen (née Morgan).

Career

The 1960s & 1970s
WFST in Caribou, ME (1965 - 1966).
WBZA in Glens Falls, NY (1966 - 1967).
WAAB in Worcester, MA (1967 - 1968).
WDRC-FM in Hartford, Connecticut (1969).
WCCC in Hartford, Connecticut (1969 -1970).
WGLD in Chicago, IL (Afternoons, 1970-1971)
CJOM in Windsor, Ontario (Detroit market) (1970-1972).
WNCR in Cleveland, Ohio (1972-1976).
WCOZ in Boston, Massachusetts (1976-1979).

The 1980s
KSAN-FM in San Francisco, CA in (1980 - 1981) - (Last year of its pioneering 12-year run as a progressive rock station before it switched to a country format).
KSFX (FM) in San Francisco, CA (1981 - 1982) - "Rock N Stereo" (with Rosie Allen).
KMEL in San Francisco, CA (1984 - 1985).
WXRK (K-Rock) in New York City, New York (1988 - 1989) - Hosted the afternoon drive-time slot that had been vacated by Howard Stern when Stern moved to mornings and began national syndication of his show.

The 1990s
Capen resisted the media-merger consolidation of radio stations and developed alternative interests in psychology, photography and travel, writing for publications including San Francisco magazine, The Village Voice, the Pacific Sun, Shambhala Sun, Writer's Digest, and LensWork Quarterly, lecturing at the University of San Francisco and California State University, Hayward, and making pilgrimages to Cuba, China, Greece, and the mountains of Peru.  He filed occasional broadcast reports for CBS News Radio and its affiliated network of stations, reported news for KVON/KVYN-FM in Napa, California, and, in his final radio work in July 2004, commentaries from Boston's 2004 Democratic National Convention for CBS all-news affiliate KNX (AM) in Los Angeles, California.

KFOG in San Francisco, CA (1992 - 1993).
KDBK in San Francisco, CA (1993 - 1994).
KUSF in San Francisco, CA (1993 - 1997) - "The Futurist Radio Hour" - Interviews with Alan Arkin, Paulo Coelho, Amanda Plummer, James Hillman, Paul Theroux, China Galland, Isabel Fonseca, Christopher Hitchens.
KVON/KVYN-FM in Napa, California (1998-2000).

Death
Capen died on September 12, 2005 near Plymouth, Massachusetts of lung cancer.  He was 59 years old.

References

External links
Bay Area Radio Museum
WDRCOBG.COM
Worldmind Interviews
Worldmind Catapult
Roadfever
Radio Vet Stephen Capen Dead At 59
Stephen Capen's 9-20-80 KSAN aircheck on Jive95.com
Under the Falling Sky in *In Search of Adventure
Radio Waves - Ben Fong-Torres
SHOWA DENKO, EOSINOPHILIA MYALGIA SYNDROME, AND THE L-TRYPTOPHAN CRISIS -- (BY STEPHEN CAPEN) (Extension of Remarks - March 30, 1992)
SHOWA DENKO, EOSINOPHILIA MYALGIA SYNDROME, AND THE L-TRYPTOPHAN CRISIS -- (BY STEPHEN CAPEN) (Extension of Remarks - March 30, 1992) 
"And Finally... 09/14/05. 10:15am" on MarksFriggin.com
excerpt on broadcasting Rutgers sit-in Incident
Audio Of Stephen Capen At KMEL

American male comedians
Radio and television announcers
American radio DJs
1946 births
2005 deaths
20th-century American musicians
20th-century American comedians